The Government Accountability Institute (GAI) is a conservative think tank located in Tallahassee, Florida. GAI was founded in 2012 by Peter Schweizer and Steve Bannon with funding from Robert Mercer and family. Schweizer serves as the group's president.

The group's stated goal is to investigate and expose government corruption, misuse of taxpayer money, and crony capitalism. It is registered as a nonpartisan organization, but largely focuses on the Democratic Party.

The group is known for promoting conspiracy theories about Hillary Clinton in 2016, as well as conspiracy theories about Joe Biden before the 2020 election.

Overview 
According to Bloomberg Businessweek, it is "a self-styled corruption watchdog group chaired and funded by conservative mega-donor Rebekah Mercer."
Members of GAI's board of directors include Steve Bannon, Peter Schweizer, Hunter Lewis, Ron Robinson (president of Young America's Foundation), and Wynton Hall.

GAI's research methods include analyzing tax filings, flight logs, and foreign government documents as well as engaging in data-mining on the deep web, which includes the 97% of information on the World Wide Web that isn't indexed by traditional search engines. It writes reports criticizing major politicians. It has worked with media outlets such as ABC News, 60 Minutes, and Newsweek to broadcast findings.

In the 2017 book Devil's Bargain, Joshua Green said Steve Bannon designed the organization to transfer partisan investigative reports to the mainstream media, which was based on his idea that mainstream reporters were more willing to report on public figures involved in scandals compared to partisan opinion, regardless of the sourcing.

Funding 
Between 2012 and 2014, GAI received donations of almost $4 million from the Mercer Family Foundation and the Koch brothers-affiliated Donors Trust.

In 2019, the New Yorker reported that most of the GAI's funding came from tax-exempt donations from the family foundation of Robert Mercer, and that in the organization's 2017 tax filings listed his daughter Rebekah as chairman of the GAI board.

Activities
The organization has most notably been involved with the research and publication of political books including Clinton Cash: The Untold Story of How and Why Foreign Governments and Businesses Helped Make Bill and Hillary Rich, Bush Bucks: How Public Service and Corporations Helped Make Jeb Rich, as well as the book Secret Empires: How the American Political Class Hides Corruption and Enriches Family and Friends, which was later cited as an initial source of the Biden–Ukraine conspiracy theory.

Clinton Cash, published in May 2015, is an investigation of donations made to the Clinton Foundation by foreign entities, paid speeches made by Bill and Hillary Clinton, and the Clintons' personal enrichment since leaving the White House in 2001.

Bush Bucks, an e-book published in October 2015, raises questions about the millions of dollars former Florida Governor Jeb Bush earned after leaving office from companies that benefited from Bush's policy while he was serving as Florida's Governor.

In October 2012, GAI released a report which asserted that "campaigns that aggressively raise money online are soliciting donations from people around the world-whether they intend to or not," and asserted that the Obama campaign had lacked "rigorous screening for donors' citizenship" (it is illegal for non-U.S. citizens to contribute to U.S. campaigns). The report provided no evidence that the Obama campaign had received any unlawful contributions.

In December 2013, a GAI analysis found that from July 12, 2010, to November 30, 2013, President Obama's public schedule showed zero one-on-one meetings between Obama and then-Secretary of Health and Human Services Kathleen Sebelius, though the study concedes that there was one instance of Secretary Sebelius meeting jointly with the
President and Secretary of the Treasury Timothy Geithner.

The GAI largely avoided investigating the presidential administration of Donald Trump, although it did release a report on potential conflicts of interest of Trump's Commerce Secretary, Wilbur Ross.

Former U.S. representative Jason Chaffetz joined the GAI as a distinguished fellow in 2021.

Links to Breitbart News
A November 2016 investigation by The Washington Post detailed ties between the Government Accountability Institute and the conservative website Breitbart News. Three GAI employees received full-time compensation while simultaneously being employed elsewhere. From 2012 to 2015, GAI co-founder and executive chair Steve Bannon received $376,000 for working 30 hours a week. He simultaneously served as executive chairman for Breitbart News. GAI communications strategist Wynton Hall received $600,000 during the same time. Hall worked as a writer for Breitbart News and was promoted to managing editor in 2013. GAI president and treasurer Peter Schweizer, also an at-large editor and writer for Breitbart News, was paid $778,000 by the GAI from 2012 to 2015.

As a 501(c)(3) public charity, GAI's political advocacy has raised the question of whether the organization had been illegally intervening in political campaigns. The Washington Post report also found that, from 2013 to 2015, GAI purchased over $200,000 in advertising from Breitbart's website.

References

External links

2012 establishments in Florida
Non-profit organizations based in Florida
Steve Bannon
Conservative organizations in the United States